785 Fifth Avenue, usually called the Park Cinq, (Park-V), is a luxury, cooperative apartment building on the Upper East Side of Manhattan in New York City. It is located at 785 Fifth Avenue, at the southeast corner with 60th Street, across from Central Park and Grand Army Plaza.

History 
The eighteen-story building was constructed by the Fisher Brothers developers in 1960.  The Park Cinq shares its Fifth Avenue block with the Sherry Netherland Hotel. The building has eighteen stories and a penthouse.  The upper floors offer "sweeping Central Park views."

The year the building opened, the New York Times described it as containing sixty-six "mansions," and described it as being "the world's most luxurious multiple dwelling." Among the luxury details considered remarkable in that era were the presence of telephone outlets in every room and special windows designed to keep out noise.  There were also marble bathrooms and parquet floors, but the entire building was in modern style unlike the traditional Renaissance and Georgian styles of older buildings in the neighborhood.  The building's dedication was attended by Prince and Princess Serge Belosselsky-Belozersky.

Notable residents have included David Geffen, Denise Rich, and Robert A. Daly. Shipping tycoon Daniel K. Ludwig lived in the penthouse when the building first opened.

References

Residential buildings in Manhattan
Condominiums and housing cooperatives in Manhattan
Fifth Avenue
Upper East Side